Gildas Guillerot (born 28 July 1963) is a French windsurfer. He competed in the Windglider event at the 1984 Summer Olympics.

References

External links
 
 

1963 births
Living people
French windsurfers
French male sailors (sport)
Olympic sailors of France
Sailors at the 1984 Summer Olympics – Windglider
Place of birth missing (living people)